Laar is a hamlet in the Dutch province of Limburg. It is located just to the south of the town Beekdaelen. The A76 motorway divides the hamlet in two parts: the largest part, to the west, is part of the municipality of Nuth; the eastern part is in municipality Heerlen. There are no place name signs and it consist of about 10 houses.

References

Populated places in Limburg (Netherlands)
Beekdaelen
Heerlen